The 2023 World Taekwondo Championships is the 26th edition of the World Taekwondo Championships and will be held in Baku, Azerbaijan  from 29 May to 6 June, 2023. This will be the first time that Azerbaijan have held the event.

Medal summary

Men

Women

References

World Taekwondo Championships
World Championships
International sports competitions hosted by Azerbaijan
Sports competitions in Baku
Taekwondo in Azerbaijan
2023 in Azerbaijani sport
World Taekwondo Championships
Taekwondo